The Diocese of Ross can refer to:

 The Diocese of Ross (Ireland), one of the historical dioceses of Ireland.
 The Diocese of Ross (Scotland) one of the historical dioceses of Scotland.

See also
 The Church of Ireland Diocese of Cork, Cloyne and Ross
 The Roman Catholic Diocese of Cork and Ross (Ireland)
 The Scottish Episcopal Diocese of Moray, Ross and Caithness